Taherabad (also Romanized as Ţāherābād) is a village in Mashiz Rural District, in the Central District of Bardsir County, Kerman Province, Iran. According to the 2006 census, its population was 318 between 86 families.

References 

Populated places in Bardsir County